Olivos may refer to:

 Olivos, Argentina, a city located on the Rio de la Plata region of South America
 Los Olivos District, a district of the Lima Province in Peru
 Los Olivos, California, an unincorporated place in Santa Barbara County, California
 Quinta de Olivos, a residential house of the president of Argentina
 Olivos metro station, a Mexico City Metro station

See also
 Olivo, a surname